Curtis J. Hammeke is an American university sports administrator and former college baseball player and coach. Hammeke is currently the director of athletics at Fort Hays State University. Prior to his current position, Hammeke served as an athletic director at a high school and two colleges, as well as the baseball coach for Fort Hays State prior to that.

Career

Early career 
Hammeke, a Great Bend, Kansas native, played baseball for Barton Community College from 1981 to 1982, and finished his collegiate baseball career at Fort Hays State University from 1983 to 1984. Two years after graduating from Fort Hays State, Hammeke began his career in athletics in 1987 as the Barton Cougars baseball assistant coach and Sports Information Director.

Fort Hays State University 
In 1992, Hammeke was hired as the head coach at his alma mater, Fort Hays State Tigers baseball, as well as an assistant athletic director.

Three jobs in eight years 
Following a successful five seasons as a head coach, Hammeke became the Great Bend High School director of athletics, a position he held from 1996 to 1998. In 1998, Hammeke left his Great Bend to become Butler Community College's director of athletics. Hammeke was responsible for hiring the National Junior College Athletic Association winningest football coach, Troy Morrell, who won three out of seven national championship appearances, and 12 conference championships. In 2003, Hammeke left Butler CC to become the athletics director at Newman University in Wichita, Kansas.

Return to Fort Hays State as AD 
In May, 2004, Hammeke was named Fort Hays State University's athletics director. During his time as the athletic director, Lewis Field Stadium has seen numerous renovations – including an artificial field – along with an indoor training facility. Hammeke has hired several successful coaches at Fort Hays State including head Tiger football coach, Chris Brown, and head women's basketball coach, Tony Hobson.

Head coach record

References

External links
 Fort Hays State profile

Living people
American men's basketball coaches
Fort Hays State Tigers baseball players
Fort Hays State Tigers baseball coaches
Fort Hays State Tigers athletic directors
Newman Jets athletic directors
People from Barton County, Kansas
Year of birth missing (living people)